Daniel Henry Edward Thompson (born 4 April 1939) is an English multi-instrumentalist best known as a double bassist. He has had a long musical career playing with a large variety of other musicians, particularly Richard Thompson and John Martyn.

For four years, between 1964 and 1967, he was a member of Alexis Korner's Blues Incorporated, led a trio that included guitarist John McLaughlin, and was a founding member of the British folk-jazz band Pentangle. Since 1987, he has also recorded four solo albums. He converted to Islam in 1990.

Biography and career
Thompson was born in Teignmouth, Devon, England. His father, a miner, joined the Royal Navy at the start of World War II and was lost in action whilst crewing submarines. When Thompson was aged 6, the family moved to London and he was brought up in the working-class area of Battersea. At school he played competitive football and was a junior for Chelsea, the team he has supported ever since. Whilst at school he learnt guitar, mandolin, trumpet and trombone before settling on the upright bass as his instrument of choice.

Thompson was a member of the folk-jazz group Pentangle, throughout its first incarnation (1967–1973) and in some of its subsequent versions and reunions. In 1987, Thompson released his debut solo album Whatever to critical acclaim.

While he has had his own album releases, Thompson has been predominantly a session musician contributing to other artists' recordings and tours, such as with John Martyn and with Richard Thompson (no relation; e.g. Mirror Blue, The Old Kit Bag, and the concert DVD release Richard Thompson Live in Austin Texas, from the Austin City Limits televised concerts).

Danny Thompson lived in Clopton, Suffolk during the late 1970s and early 1980s with his wife Daphne and son Dan (Danny Junior, who went on to be the drummer with Hawkwind (1985–88)) Early in the 1980s he moved back to London. He received a Lifetime achievement award in the 2007 BBC Radio 2 Folk Awards.

In the early 1980s he worked closely with documentary film-maker, Roy Deverell and composed music for two of his award-winning films, Echo of the Wild and A Passion to Protect. The films are about John Aspinall's pioneering work with endangered mammals.

He accepted Islam in 1990, taking the Muslim name Hamza.

Between 1995 and 2013, he was a member of the ‘house band’ in five of the six series of the BBC/RTE Transatlantic Sessions.

Partial discography

Alexis Korner's Blues Incorporated
Red Hot from Alex (1964)
Sky High (1966)
Blues Incorporated (1967 - re-issue of Sky High)

Alexis Korner
I Wonder Who (1967)
A New Generation of Blues (1968)

Pentangle
The Pentangle (1968)
Sweet Child (1968)
Basket of Light (1969)
Cruel Sister (1970)
Reflection (1971)
Solomon's Seal (1972)
Open the Door (1985)

Danny Thompson
Whatever (1987)
Whatever Next (1989)
Elemental (1990)
Whatever’s Best (1995)
Danny Thompson & Peter Knight (1995) Resurgence – RES108CD
Connected (2012)

Danny Thompson, Allan Holdsworth and John Stevens
Propensity (2009, recorded 1978)

Dizrhythmia
Dizrhythmia (1988)
Too (2016)

Richard Thompson and Danny Thompson
Live at Crawley (1995)
Industry (1997)

Jon Thorne & Danny Thompson
Watching the Well (2010)

Others
Danny Thompson has played on dozens of albums and singles during his career. The following is only a small selection.
ABC: Alphabet City (1987)
Skin: Fleshwounds (2003)
Ayuo: Songs from a Eurasian Journey (1997)
Richard Barbieri: Stranger Inside (2008)
The Blind Boys of Alabama: Spirit of the Century (2001)
Sam Brown: Stop! (1988)
Tim Buckley: Dream Letter: Live in London 1968 (1968)
Kate Bush: The Dreaming (1982); Hounds of Love (1985); 50 Words for Snow (2011); Director's Cut (2011)
Christine Collister: The Dark Gift of Time (1998); An Equal Love (2001)
Graham Coxon: The Spinning Top (2009)
Barbara Dickson: Don't Think Twice (1992); Dark End of the Street (1995)
Donovan: Barabajagal (1968); HMS Donovan (1971); Essence to Essence (1973); Love Is Only Feeling (1981); Sutras (1996); Beat Cafe (2004)
Nick Drake: Five Leaves Left (1969)
Everything but the Girl: Amplified Heart (1994)
Marianne Faithfull: North Country Maid (1966); The World of Marianne Faithfull (1970)
Peter Gabriel: Up (2002)
Davey Graham: Folk Blues & Beyond (1965); Large as Life & Twice as Natural (1968); Hat (1969); Fire in the Soul (1999)
Mara!: Images (1984); On the Edge (1987)
Boo Hewerdine: Baptist Hospital (1995)
Mary Hopkin: Earth Song / Ocean Song (1971); Live at the Royal Festival Hall 1972 (2005)
Hunter Muskett: Every Time You Move (1970)
The Incredible String Band: The 5000 Spirits (1967); Hard Rope & Silken Twine (1973)
Bert Jansch: Birthday Blues (1969); Moonshine (1972); L.A. Turnaround (1974); Avocet (1979); Sketches (1990)
Tasmin Archer: Great Expectations (1992)
Linda Lewis: Fathoms Deep (1973)
Mike Lindup: Changes (1990)
Magna Carta: Lord of the Ages (1973)
John Martyn: Bless the Weather (1972); Solid Air (1973); Inside Out (1973); Sunday's Child (1975); Live at Leeds (1975); One World (1977); On the Cobbles (2004)
John & Beverley Martyn: The Road to Ruin (1970)
The Chris McGregor Septet: Up to Earth (1969. released 2008 by Fledg'ling CD, Stamford Audio vinyl)
Loreena McKennitt: The Book of Secrets (1997)
Ralph McTell: Easy (1974)
Alison Moyet: Hoodoo (1991)
Duffy Power (as Duffy's Nucleus): Mary Open the Door/Hound Dog single (1967; re-released on various compilation albums)
Deva Premal: Dakshina (2005)
Cliff Richard: Congratulations (1968)
Andrew Ridgeley: Son of Albert (1990)
S. E. Rogie: Dead Men Don't Smoke Marijuana (1997)
Darrell Scott: Theatre of the Unheard (2003); Live in NC (2004)
Songhai. Collaboration with flamenco group Ketama and kora player Toumani Diabaté: Songhai (1988); Songhai 2 (1994)
Rod Stewart: Every Picture Tells a Story (1971)
David Sylvian: Brilliant Trees (1984); Secrets of the Beehive (1987)
Talk Talk: The Colour of Spring (1986); Spirit of Eden (1988)
Richard Thompson: Hand of Kindness (1982); Amnesia (1988); Mirror Blue (1994); Live at Crawley (1995); You? Me? Us? (1996); Two Letter Words (1996); Celtschmerz (1998); Mock Tudor (1999); Semi-Detached Mock Tudor (2002); The Old Kit Bag (2003); Ducknapped! (2003); Live from Austin, TX (2005); Sweet Warrior (2007)
Thunderbirds (TV series): (theme tune) (1964)
T. Rex: Light of Love (1974); Zinc Alloy and the Hidden Riders of Tomorrow (1974)
Loudon Wainwright III: I'm Alright (1985); More Love Songs (1986); Therapy (1989)
Dawud Wharnsby: Vacuous Waxing (2004)
Vivian Stanshall: Crank (1991)
Eric Bibb & North Country Far: The Happiest Man In The World (2016)

References

External links

The Official Danny Thompson Website
The Danny Thompson Website (archived 2011)
Danny Thompson My Space
Thompson and Islam
Worked extensively with John Martyn in the 1970s
Some of the Notes Hurt Your Eyes - A musical conversation with Bassist Danny Thompson
Entry for Danny Thompson at allmusic.com
1 of several entries for Danny Thompson at allmusic.com with mixed-up data
Another of several entries for Danny Thompson at allmusic.com with mixed-up data
 
 

1939 births
Living people
People from Teignmouth
English double-bassists
Male double-bassists
Converts to Islam
English Muslims
People from Battersea
British folk rock musicians
Epic Records artists
British rhythm and blues boom musicians
Musicians from Devon
Pentangle (band) members
Blues Incorporated members
21st-century double-bassists
21st-century British male musicians